Guthorm or Guthormus was one of the earliest legendary Danish kings according to Saxo Grammaticus. He was a son Danish king, Gram and Swedish princess, Groa.

History
His father was slain by his uncle, the Norwegian king, Svipdagr. After the incident, his uncle installed him as the puppet king of the Danes. However, his half-brother, Hading refused the offer and entered exile, later he returned and retook his father's kingdom, but lack of mentions of Guthorm implies that his half-brother died before his return.

Text

References

Mythological kings of Denmark